This article contains information about the literary events and publications of 1821.

Events
May – Percy Bysshe Shelley's Queen Mab: a philosophical poem (1813) is distributed by a pirate publisher in London, leading to prosecution by the Society for the Prevention of Vice.
August 4 – Atkinson & Alexander publish The Saturday Evening Post for the first time as a weekly newspaper in the United States.
unknown dates
James Ballantyne begins publishing his Novelist's Library in Edinburgh edited by Sir Walter Scott.
In the first known obscenity case in the United States, a Massachusetts court outlaws the John Cleland novel Fanny Hill (1748). The publisher, Peter Holmes, is convicted of printing a "lewd and obscene" novel.
Sunthorn Phu is imprisoned and begins his epic poem Phra Aphai Mani.

New books

Fiction
James Fenimore Cooper – The Spy
Pierce Egan – Life in London; Boxiana Vol. III
John Galt
Annals of the Parish
The Ayrshire Legatees
Johann Wolfgang von Goethe – Wilhelm Meister's Journeyman Years (Wilhelm Meisters Wanderjahre)
Ann Hatton – Lovers and Friends
Hannah Maria Jones – Gretna Green
Charles Nodier – Smarra
Anna Maria Porter – The Village of Mariendorpt
Jane Porter – The Scottish Chiefs
Sir Walter Scott – Kenilworth

Children
Maria Hack – Harry Beaufoy; or the Pupil of Nature
Thomas Love Peacock – Maid Marian

Drama
John Banim and Richard Lalor Sheil – Damon and Pythias
Lord Byron
Marino Faliero, Doge of Venice (published & performed)
Sardanapalus: a tragedy; The Two Foscari: a tragedy; Cain: a mystery (published together)
 Barry Cornwall – Mirandola'
Alexandre-Vincent Pineux Duval – Le Faux BonhommeAleksander Fredro – Pan Geldhab (Mr. Gelhab)
Franz Grillparzer – Das goldene Vliess (The Golden Fleece trilogy)
Heinrich von Kleist (died 1811) – The Prince of Homburg (Prinz Friedrich von Homburg oder die Schlacht bei Fehrbellin, first performance, in abridged version as Die Schlacht von Fehrbellin; completed 1810)

Poetry
Heinrich Heine – PoemsAlessandro Manzoni – Il Cinque Maggio (May 5th)
Alexander Pushkin - The GabrieliadPercy Bysshe Shelley – AdonaïsNon-fiction
James Burney – An Essay, by Way of Lecture, on the Game of WhistOwen Chase – Narrative of the Most Extraordinary and Distressing Shipwreck of the Whale-Ship EssexWilliam Cobbett – The American GardenerGeorge Grote – Statement of the Question of Parliamentary ReformWilliam Hazlitt – Table-TalkJames Mill – Elements of Political EconomyRobert Owen – Report to the County of Lanark, of a plan for relieving public distress and removing discontentJohn Roberton – Kalogynomia, or the Laws of Female BeautyRobert Southey – Life of Cromwell''

Births
March 19 – Richard Francis Burton, English polymath (died 1890)
March 20 – Ned Buntline (Edward Zane Carroll Judson Sr.), American publisher, dime novelist and publicist (died 1886)
March 25 – Isabella Banks, English poet and novelist (died 1897)
April 9 – Charles Baudelaire, French poet (died 1867)
May 8 – Charlotte Maria Tucker, English children's writer (died 1893)
May 11 – Grigore Sturdza, Moldavian and Romanian adventurer, literary sponsor and philosopher (died 1901)
June 30 – William Hepworth Dixon, English historian, traveler and journal editor (died 1879)
October 30 – Fyodor Dostoevsky, Russian novelist (died 1881)
November 28 – Nikolai Alekseevich Nekrasov, Russian poet, writer and critic (died 1877)
September 21 – Aurora Ljungstedt, Swedish horror writer (died 1908) 
December 1 – Jane C. Bonar, Scottish hymnwriter (died 1884)
December 6 – Dora Greenwell, English poet (died 1882)
December 12 – Gustave Flaubert, French novelist (died 1880)

Deaths
January 14 – Jens Zetlitz, Norwegian poet (born 1761)
February 23 – John Keats, English poet (tuberculosis, born 1795)
February 26 – Joseph de Maistre, Savoyard philosopher (born 1753)
March 17 – Louis-Marcelin de Fontanes, French poet (born 1757)
April 16 – Thomas Scott, English cleric and religious writer (born 1747)
May 2 – Hester Thrale (Mrs Piozzi), English diarist and arts patron (born 1741)
May 21 – John Jones (Jac Glan-y-gors), Welsh poet and satirist (born 1766)
May 22 – Johann Georg Heinrich Feder, German philosopher (born 1740)
August 1 – Elizabeth Inchbald, English novelist and dramatist (born 1753)
November 17 – James Burney, English rear-admiral and naval writer (born 1750)

Awards
Chancellor's Gold Medal and Newdigate Prize – George Howard

References

 
Years of the 19th century in literature